Zbigniew Senkowski (27 October 1955 – 17 October 2022) was a Polish trade unionist and politician.

A member of Solidarity Electoral Action, he served in the Sejm from 1997 to 2001.

Senkowski died in October 2022, at the age of 66.

References

1955 births
2022 deaths
Members of the Polish Sejm 1997–2001
Solidarity Electoral Action politicians
Law and Justice politicians
People from Wałbrzych
Polish trade unionists
Recipients of Cross of Freedom and Solidarity